The term rice bug may apply to a number of species in at least three bug genera that attack rice: especially at the later panicle stages.  They include:
 Species in the genus Leptocorisa,
 Oebalus pugnax a.k.a. the rice stink bug,
 Species in the genus Stenocoris.

Animal common name disambiguation pages
Heteroptera